Metzner is a German surname, which may have formed from the German word  metze, a small dry-measure for grain, or metzjen, the occupational name for a butcher. It is also a habitational name that stems Metz from Lorraine, typically a Jewish name, and from Metzen in Lower Bavaria. The origin of the surname has led to various other related spellings.

Metzner may refer to:

American

Arthur B. Metzner, Canada-born American chemical engineering professor and rheologist.
Carroll Metzner, politician and legislator for Wisconsin.
Charles Miller Metzner, federal judge.
David Metzner, lawyer
Jordan Metzner, California Burrito Co. founder.
Ralph Metzner, psychologist, writer and researcher, participated in psychedelic research.
Sheila Metzner, Brooklyn, NY, photographer.
Chris Metzner, Everett, WA, Artist and Designer

French
Olivier Metzner, criminal defense lawyer

German

Ernö Metzner, director of Polizeibericht Überfall
Karl-Heinz Metzner, footballer.
Franz Metzner, sculptor.
Helmut Metzner, plant physiologist.

See also
"Shell-Metzner", incorrectly attributed naming of "Shell sort", a sorting algorithm.
Mertz - an origin-related spelling of Metzner.

References

Sources

Occupational surnames